The role of the United States men's national soccer team coach was first established in 1916 with the appointment of Thomas Cahill. Thirty-seven men have occupied this position.

The following tables include various statistics for head coaches of the United States men's national soccer team (featuring matches, wins, losses, ties, goals for, goals against, and goal differential along with goals for average and goals-against average) from the team's inception in 1916 through to the January 28, 2023 match with the Colombia.

The result percentage is based on the formula used by U.S. Soccer in their U.S. Soccer Media Guide, found on page 78.

Head coaches
Category items in bold represent leader based on a minimum of 18 matches
.
All-Time Record: 329–162–264 (W-D-L) – 54.30% (counting draws as 0.5 wins and 0.5 losses)

Sources: 
USMNT All-Time Scores – SoccerOverThere.com.
USA national football team 
United States men's national soccer team results

References

 
United States men